Adata  may refer to:

 Adata, Greek name of Hadath, or full name Al-Ḥadath al-Ḥamrā, a medieval fortress town near the Taurus Mountains in Cilicia, (modern southeastern Turkey), which played an important role in the Byzantine–Arab Wars
 Adata, an island in the Maritsa River in the city of Plovdiv, Bulgaria
 ADATA, a Taiwanese memory and storage manufacturer